The 2014 World Short Track Speed Skating Championships took place from 14 to 17 March 2014 at the Maurice-Richard Arena in Montreal, Quebec, Canada. They were the 39th World Short Track Speed Skating Championships, the fifth to be held in Canada and the third to be held in Montreal.

Results
The Overall World Champion is determined by adding the points received by the athletes taking part in the final of each event; points are not awarded for any races other than the event finals.

For each final race: 34 points are awarded for first place, 21 points for second place, 13 points for third place, 8 points for fourth place, 5 points for fifth place, 3 points for sixth place, 2 points for seventh place, and 1 point is awarded for eighth place. In the 3000 m super-final, an additional 5 points are awarded to the athlete who is leading the race after the first 1000 m. The relay events do not count towards the overall classification.

The athlete with the second most points wins the overall silver medal, and the next highest point scorer wins overall bronze.

Men

Women

Medal table

References

External links
Results book

World Short Track Speed Skating Championships
World Short Track Championships
Sports competitions in Montreal
International speed skating competitions hosted by Canada
World Short Track Championships
World Short Track Championships